Sokolniki-Las  is a village in the administrative district of Gmina Ozorków, within Zgierz County, Łódź Voivodeship, in central Poland.

The village has an approximate population of 340.

References

Sokolniki-Las